Ujhana is a village in Jind district in Haryana, India, located at the Punjab-Haryana border.

Village life
The village's primary industry is agriculture. The main temple is Baba khak nath; other temples include Ashann and the dharamshala Thaai, which is shared with the surrounding villages of Ambarsar, Nepewala, Dhundua, Koyal, and Kurar. The village has a sport stadium with a  track and public gym, and is known for its Thai and Asian food. Ujhana's Indigenous population are largely Jats. Common surnames include Gill, Sinhmar, Malik, Chahal, Berwal, and Rasila.

Notable people 
 Manjit Chahal, 2018 Asian games gold medalist athlete

References 

Villages in Jind district